Henry Antonio Meléndez Sánchez (born 2 July 1984) is a Venezuelan football manager.

Career
Born in Caracas, Meléndez started his career with Deportivo Gulima, a club focused on youth development, and worked for the side for ten years. He then was in charge of Deportivo La Guaira and Atlético Venezuela's youth categories before being named assistant manager of Enrique García at Deportivo Petare in 2016.

Meléndez returned to Atlético Venezuela and its youth setup in 2017, remaining for two years before joining Caracas, where he was in charge of the reserve side. On 19 September 2019, he returned to his previous club after being named first team manager, in the place of Jaime de la Pava.

On 31 October 2020, Meléndez left Atlético on a mutual agreement. On 16 August of the following year, he took over Zulia in the place of Frank Flores.

On 15 April 2022, Meléndez was sacked by Zulia. On 21 June, he returned to Caracas after being named youth coordinator, but was named manager on 19 September as Francesco Stifano was sacked.

References

External links

1984 births
Living people
Sportspeople from Caracas
Venezuelan football managers
Venezuelan Primera División managers
Venezuelan Segunda División managers
Atlético Venezuela C.F. managers
Zulia F.C. managers
Caracas FC managers